Anna Marie Jernigan (born July 15, 1998), better known by the ring name Anna Jay, is an American professional wrestler. She is signed to All Elite Wrestling, where she performs under the ring name Anna Jay A.S., and is a member of the  Jericho Appreciation Society stable.

Professional wrestling career

Independent circuit (2018–2020) 
Jay started training at One Fall Power Factory in July 2018. In April 2019 during training, she suffered a shoulder injury that required surgery and was out of action for 4 to 6 months. On September 14, 2019, Jay made her debut at Glacier's charity event "The Battle of Altama". In January 2020, Jay defeated Thunder Blonde in a hair vs. hair match at a Georgia Premier Wrestling event.

All Elite Wrestling (2020–present) 
Jay made her first appearance in All Elite Wrestling (AEW) on April 1, 2020, losing to Hikaru Shida in singles competition on Dynamite. She was announced as having signed with the company that same month. Following a loss to  Abadon on the June 17 episode of Dynamite, she was then helped backstage by The Dark Order. Jay teamed with Tay Conti in the AEW Women's Tag Team Cup Tournament: The Deadly Draw. They advanced in the quarterfinals by defeating Nyla Rose and Ariane Andrew but lost to Ivelisse and Diamante during the semifinals. She was officially introduced as a member of The Dark Order on the August 27 episode of Dynamite. On the November 25 episode of Dynamite, Jay challenged Shida for the AEW Women's World Championship in a losing effort. On December 30, she and Conti defeated Britt Baker and Penelope Ford on the special episode of Dynamite and tribute to deceased leader of The Dark Order, Brodie Lee, dubbed the Brodie Lee Celebration of Life. In February 2021, Jay was set to compete in the AEW Women's World Championship Eliminator Tournament but was taken off after suffering a shoulder injury during training. She underwent surgery the following month, and was expected not to wrestle for 6–12 months.

Jay returned from injury on the September 1 episode of Dynamite, saving Conti from an attack by Ford and The Bunny after Conti defeated Ford in a match. In November, Jay competed in the TBS Women's Championship Tournament, where she lost to Jamie Hayter in the first round. After months of feuding, the team of Jay and Conti defeated the team of Ford and The Bunny in a street fight on December 31 on Rampage. Jay then challenged Jade Cargill for the AEW TBS Championship in the main event of the January 21, 2022 edition of Rampage, where she was unsuccessful.  On May 29, Jay faced Cargill for the championship again at Double or Nothing where she was unsuccessful again. On July 20, during Night 2 of Fyter Fest, Jay turned heel by attacking Ruby Soho, thus reuniting with Conti and joining the Jericho Appreciation Society. After her heel turn, Jay would go on to defeat Ruby Soho during the Rampage portion of Fight for the Fallen, choking Soho out with her own arm brace. 

Her heel turn would also see a gimmick change for Jay, who would  often threaten to choke people out and even do so twice during backstage interviews. She would also adopt the new ring name of Anna Jay A.S. as a reference to her new stable, while also being referred by her original name. Jay and Melo would continue their feud with Soho throughout the rest of 2022 and the beginning of 2023, with Jay and Melo beating Soho and Willow Nightingale in a tag team match on the December 28 episode of Dynamite and Soho and Nightingale beating them in a street fight on the January 11, 2023 episode of Rampage.

Personal life
On June 28, 2021, Jay revealed over social media that she is currently in a relationship with fellow AEW wrestler Jack Perry.

Championships and accomplishments 
 All Elite Wrestling
 AEW Dynamite Awards (1 time)
 Biggest WTF Moment (2022) – 
 Pro Wrestling Illustrated
 Ranked No. 103 of the top 150 female wrestlers in the PWI Women's 150 in 2022

Luchas de Apuestas record

References

External links

Georgia Premier Wrestling profile

1998 births
21st-century professional wrestlers
All Elite Wrestling personnel
American female professional wrestlers
Living people
Professional wrestlers from Georgia (U.S. state)
People from Brunswick, Georgia
Sportspeople from Georgia (U.S. state)
The Dark Order members
Jericho Appreciation Society members